Christopher Shaw may refer to:

Christopher Shaw (cricketer) (born 1964), English cricketer
Christopher Shaw (composer) (1924–1995), British composer
Christopher Shaw (neurologist) (born 1960)
Christopher Shaw (neuroscientist), Canadian neuroscientist
Christopher Shaw of Dubious Brothers

See also
Chris Shaw (disambiguation)